These are the songs that reached number one on the Top 100 Best Sellers chart in 1961 as published by Cash Box magazine.

See also
1961 in music
List of Hot 100 number-one singles of 1961 (U.S.)

References
https://web.archive.org/web/20110610234634/http://cashboxmagazine.com/archives/60s_files/1961.html

1961
1961 record charts
1961 in American music